Palais Harrach is a Baroque palace in Vienna, Austria. It was owned by the noble Harrach family. The building was extensively renovated and restored in the late 1990s, and it houses offices and shops today.

Count Ferdinand Bonaventura I von Harrach bought a ruined edifice on this site in the late 17th century, which was replaced  by a new one designed by Domenico Martinelli in 1696–98. From  1870 to 1970, it housed Aloys Thomas Raimund von Harrach's picture collection (now in Schloss Rohrau). The palace was sold to the municipality of Vienna in 1975.

External links
 

Harrach
Buildings and structures in Innere Stadt
Harrach family
Baroque architecture in Vienna